Tri Repetae (stylised as tri repetae.) is the third studio album by English electronic music duo Autechre, released on 6 November 1995 by Warp in the United Kingdom. In contrast to the duo's previous albums, Incunabula (1993) and Amber (1994), Tri Repetae features a distinct style that incorporates more minimal rhythms and spacious melodies.

Background
In the year leading up to the production of Tri Repetae, Booth and Brown had both been Sheffield residents, with Sean moving both house and studio to Jez Potter, a friend and fellow experimental producer based in Brighton who introduced the duo to his collaborator Mat Steel, and additionally the English experimental artist Mark Fell. Potter had been performing DJ sets across the United Kingdom at clubs with dedicated "ambient rooms", such as the London venue Megatripolis; Booth and Brown had also been appearing regularly and anonymously alongside Fell on weekly radio broadcasts by Potter on the Sheffield pirate radio station Foulmouth FM. Subsequently, Tri Repetae marked a significant change in both the duo's musical style and their approach to music production, heavily inspired by the glitch music of Potter and Fell.

In contrast to previous albums by Autechre, Incunabula (1993) and Amber (1994), Tri Repetae features a distinct style that incorporates more minimal, repetitive rhythmic patterns and intricate, spacious arrays of melodies; the aesthetical shift was intentionally echoed by its album cover designed by the duo's visual collaborators The Designers Republic, consisting of only a single shade of beige. Stemming from Autechre's increasing preoccupation with unique electronic musical textures and glitches, the liner notes of the album mention a preference to listen to the album on vinyl for surface noise; the CD version states that the album is "incomplete without surface noise", whereas the vinyl version satisfactorily states that it is "complete with surface noise".

Release
In preparation for the 1997 release of the duo's fourth studio album Chiastic Slide, Tri Repetae was rereleased on 16 March 1996 by Wax Trax! Records and TVT Records in the United States as a two-disc set named Tri Repetae++, which included the Garbage and Anvil Vapre EPs constituting the second CD. In Japan, it was released with the bonus track "Medrey".

Critical reception

In 2017, Pitchfork ranked Tri Repetae at number three on its list of "The 50 Best IDM Albums of All Time".

Track listing

Charts

References

External links
Tri Repetae at Warp
Tri Repetae at Bleep.com (features audio clips)

Autechre albums
1995 albums
Warp (record label) albums